Wallis (also Walls) is an unincorporated community in Forrest County, Mississippi, United States.

Notes

Unincorporated communities in Forrest County, Mississippi
Unincorporated communities in Mississippi